Sanduo may refer to:

Sando (official) (1876–1941), a Qing dynasty and Republic of China official who was the last Qing viceroy of Mongolia
Sanduo, Jiangsu (三垛), a town in Gaoyou, Jiangsu, China
Sanduo Township (三多乡), a township in Daning County, Shanxi, China